List of astronauts or space travellers, may refer to:

By name
 List of astronauts by name

By nationality
 List of space travelers by nationality
 Timeline of space travel by nationality
 American astronauts
 List of Apollo astronauts
 Astronaut birthplaces by US state
 List of Gemini astronauts
 Mercury Seven
 NASA Astronaut Corps
 NASA Astronaut Group 2
 NASA Astronaut Group 3
 NASA Astronaut Group 4
 NASA Astronaut Group 5
 NASA Astronaut Group 6
 NASA Astronaut Group 7
 NASA Astronaut Group 8
 NASA Astronaut Group 9
 NASA Astronaut Group 10
 NASA Astronaut Group 11
 NASA Astronaut Group 12
 NASA Astronaut Group 13
 NASA Astronaut Group 14
 NASA Astronaut Group 15
 NASA Astronaut Group 16
 NASA Astronaut Group 17
 NASA Astronaut Group 18
 NASA Astronaut Group 19
 NASA Astronaut Group 20
 NASA Astronaut Group 21
 NASA Astronaut Group 22
 NASA Astronaut Group 23
 List of United States Marine Corps astronauts
 List of United States Space Force astronauts
 Canadian Astronaut Corps
 List of Chinese astronauts
 List of cosmonauts
 Roscosmos Cosmonaut Corps
 List of European astronauts
 European Astronaut Corps
 List of Dutch astronauts
 List of German astronauts

By demographic group
 List of African-American astronauts
 List of Arab astronauts
 List of Asian astronauts
 List of female astronauts
 List of Hispanic astronauts
 List of Ibero-American spacefarers
 List of Muslim astronauts
 List of billionaire spacetravellers

By achievement
 List of cumulative spacewalk records
 List of inductees in the International Space Hall of Fame
 List of visitors to the International Space Station
 List of Mir visitors
 List of Space Shuttle crews
 List of spacewalkers
 List of Salyut visitors

Other
 List of astronauts by year of selection
 List of space travellers by first flight
 List of space travelers by company
 Lists of fictional astronauts

Space flights
 List of human spaceflights, 1961–1970
 List of human spaceflights, 1971–1980
 List of human spaceflights, 1981–1990
 List of human spaceflights, 1991–2000
 List of human spaceflights, 2001–2010
 List of human spaceflights, 2011–2020
List of human spaceflights, 2021–present 
 List of Russian human spaceflight missions
 List of Soviet human spaceflight missions

See also 
 Lists of astronomical objects
 Lists of telescopes
 Lists of spacecraft
 List of government space agencies
 Lists of space scientists